The Communist Youth Union is a youth organization, unofficially cooperated with the Communist Party of Bohemia and Moravia. It was founded in 1990. The Czech Ministry of Interior dissolved KSM in 2006 due to its radical stances. It was reestablished in 2010.

The Communist Youth Union is the only WFDY member organization in the Czech Republic.

Footnotes

External links
  Communist Youth Union Official Website

Politics of the Czech Republic
Youth politics
Youth wings of communist parties
1990 establishments in Czechoslovakia
Youth organizations established in 1990
Youth wings of political parties in the Czech Republic
Communist Party of Bohemia and Moravia
2006 disestablishments in the Czech Republic
2010 establishments in the Czech Republic